Santa Rosa High School, also abbreviated as  SRHS, is a public high school located in Santa Rosa, Texas (USA). It is the sole high school in the Santa Rosa Independent School District. In 2015, the school was rated "Met Standard" by the Texas Education Agency.

Athletics
The Santa Rosa Warriors compete in the following sports:

Baseball
Basketball
Cross Country
Football
Golf
Powerlifting
Softball
Tennis
Track and Field
Volleyball

References

External links 
 Official website

High schools in Cameron County, Texas
Public high schools in Texas